Windermere was an electoral district of the Legislative Assembly in the Australian state of Victoria from 1889 to 1904.

Members

 = by-election
 = died 29 December 1893

References

Former electoral districts of Victoria (Australia)
1889 establishments in Australia
1904 disestablishments in Australia